Agnellus (487 – 1 August 570) was a bishop of Ravenna in the Praetorian prefecture of Italy from 557 to his death. The main source about him is by Liber Pontificalis Ecclesiae Ravennatis by Andreas Agnellus.

Biography 
Agnellus was probably born in 487, based on the estimation of his age at the time of death. He was apparently born to a prominent family of Italian nobles, as he is recorded inheriting great wealth. He married and had a daughter. The death of his wife motivated him to become a priest. He was consecrated a deacon by Ecclesius of Ravenna (term 521–532).

Agnellus became Bishop of Ravenna in 557. He held the title until his death on 1 August, 570. His term lasted 13 years. He was reportedly 83 years old at the time of death. A granddaughter of his was named as the heir to his estate.

References

Sources 
 

487 births
570 deaths
Archbishops of Ravenna
6th-century Byzantine bishops
6th-century Italo-Roman people